Sahlabad (also Romanized as Sahlābād; also known as Aḩmadābād, Sahīlābād, Sātābād, and Sātābād) is a village in Ramjerd-e Do Rural District, Dorudzan District, Marvdasht County, Fars Province, Iran. At the 2006 census, its population was 153, in 41 families.

References 

Populated places in Marvdasht County